Rae Helen Langton, FBA (born 14 February 1961) is an Australian-British professor of philosophy. She is currently the Knightbridge Professor of Philosophy at the University of Cambridge. She has published widely on Immanuel Kant's philosophy, moral philosophy, political philosophy, metaphysics, and feminist philosophy. She is also well known for her work on pornography and objectification.

Life, education and career

Langton was born in 1961 in Ludhiana, India to David Langton and his wife Valda. A carpenter and a nurse, respectively, they were at the time lay missionaries. She attended Hebron School, Coonoor and Ootacamund, India. In 1980 she moved to Australia and attended the University of New England in Armidale, New South Wales. In 1981 she enrolled at the University of Sydney where she majored in philosophy. There she became interested in Kant. Her Honours thesis argued that Kant's scientific realism did not fit with his idealism. She graduated with First Class Honours in 1986. She was one of a group of women honours graduates at the time encouraged to continue their studies by applying to graduate school in the United States. In 1986 Langton moved to the United States and began graduate work at Princeton University in the philosophy department. While studying social philosophy at Princeton she became interested in the philosophical debates on free speech and pornography.

In 1990, before writing her PhD thesis, Langton moved back to Australia. From 1990–98 she was a Lecturer and Senior Lecturer in the Philosophy department of Monash University in Melbourne.

Langton received her PhD in 1995 from Princeton. Her thesis advisor was Margaret Dauler Wilson; and her thesis topic was Kantian Humility.

In 1998 Langton was a Fellow in the Research School of Social Sciences at the Australian National University. She moved to the United Kingdom in 1998. From 1998 to 1999 she was a lecturer at Sheffield University. From 1999 to 2004 she was Professor of Moral Philosophy at the University of Edinburgh. From 2004 to 2013 she was back in the United States as a Professor in the Department of Linguistics and Philosophy at the Massachusetts Institute of Technology.

In 2012 she was one of several philosophers who submitted evidence to the Leveson Inquiry into press ethics.

She was inducted into the American Academy of Arts and Sciences in October 2013.

In 2013 she joined the Faculty of Philosophy at the University of Cambridge and became a Fellow of Newnham College, Cambridge. In 2014, she was elected a Fellow of the British Academy, the United Kingdom's national academy for the humanities and social sciences. She gave the John Locke Lectures on 'Accommodating Injustice' at Oxford University in 2015.

In 2017 she was appointed to the Knightbridge Professor of Philosophy at Cambridge, the first woman to hold this professorship.

She is married to fellow philosopher Richard Holton.

Philosophical work

In 1990, in response to Ronald Dworkin's Is There a Right to Pornography?, Langton published Whose right? Ronald Dworkin, Women, and Pornographers. In it she argued that the positions Dworkin takes on segregation and affirmative action are not consistent with his position in defence of pornography. The paper was voted one of the ten best articles in philosophy that year.
In 1993 she published her paper Speech Acts and Unspeakable Acts.

According to Mary Kate McGowan, "Rather than focus on the harms allegedly caused, Langton explores the hypothesis that pornography actually constitutes harm."

Her first book, Kantian Humility: Our Ignorance of Things in Themselves, is based on her thesis. According to one reviewer, "In this perspective there is no idealism in Kant, rather what Langton calls epistemic humility." Another reviewer described the book as "one of the most original and thought-provoking books on Kant to have appeared for quite some time."

Many of the papers she published from 1990–99 were collected in her 2009 book, Sexual Solipsism: Philosophical Essays on Pornography and Objectification, along with her responses to some of her critics. Regarding this book, Wellesley College philosophy professor Mary Kate McGowan wrote in  Notre Dame Philosophical Reviews that "...Langton's crisp, clear, and careful argumentation proves that philosophy has much to offer the socially, politically and even legally charged issues addressed here... This is feminist scholarship at its very best. It's first-rate philosophy." Langton has written more than fifty articles about subjects ranging from feminist approaches to pornography, to animal ethics, to hate speech.

Awards and honours
 Philosophers' Annual, Whose Right? ("top ten" articles of 1990)
 American Academy of Arts and Sciences, inducted October 2013
 Prospect Magazine – 50 World's Top Thinker's 2014
 Elected a Fellow of the British Academy, 2014
 John Locke Lectures, Oxford University, 2015
 Hägerström Lectures, Uppsala University, 2015 
 Doctor Honoris Causa, University of Klagenfurt, 2020

Bibliography
 
 
  Pdf.
 See also:  Preview.
 See also: 
  Pdf.
  Pdf.
 See also:  Pdf.

References

External links
 Rae Langton CV
 The Disappearing Women – an opinion piece on women in philosophy published in The Stone on 4 September 2013.
 Rae Langton on Hate Speech – a Philosophy Bites audio interview from 28 July 2012.

1961 births
21st-century Australian philosophers
21st-century British philosophers
Living people
Analytic philosophers
Australian feminist writers
British ethicists
Fellows of Newnham College, Cambridge
Feminist philosophers
Kantian philosophers
Metaphysicians
Political philosophers
Australian women philosophers
Fellows of the British Academy
Knightbridge Professors of Philosophy